Kjærlighet og vennskap is a 1941 Norwegian film directed by Leif Sinding and starring Sonja Wigert, Georg Løkkeberg, and Per Aabel. The film was produced at A/S Merkur-Film and features music by Jolly Kramer-Johansen.

Cast
Sonja Wigert as Eva Jespersen
Georg Løkkeberg as Harald Jespersen
Per Aabel as Anton Schack
Rønnaug Alten as Ragna
Tryggve Larssen as Onkel Johan
Kiste Lund as Else Simonsen
Thomas Thomassen as G. O. Hansen
Henrik Børseth as agent Kraakstad
Eugène Bech as Dr. Hallander
Sophus Dahl as Erik Lind
Ulf Selmer as Per Arnesen, barrister
Turid Haaland as Hulda

References

External links
 

1941 films
1940s Norwegian-language films
Films directed by Leif Sinding
1941 comedy films
Norwegian comedy films
Norwegian black-and-white films